Chezi-ye Olya (also Romanized as Chezī-ye ‘Olyā; also known as Chazī, Chīzī, and Menār) is a village in Abezhdan Rural District, Abezhdan District, Andika County, Khuzestan Province, Iran. At the 2006 census, its population was 263, in 47 families.

References 

Populated places in Andika County